Badulla railway station (බදුල්ල දුම්රිය ස්ථානය) is the last station on the Main Line, and is  away from Colombo. The trains that run on the Main Line, including the Podi Menike and Udarata Menike express trains end at the station.

The construction of the line from Nanu Oya to Badulla was completed in 1924, with the passenger traffic first commencing on 5 February 1924, although the station wasn't officially opened until 5 April 1924.

Continuity

References

Railway stations in Badulla District
Railway stations on the Main Line (Sri Lanka)
Railway stations opened in 1924
Archaeological protected monuments in Badulla District
Buildings and structures in Badulla